DiResta is an American sitcom which premiered on UPN on October 5, 1998, on its Monday schedule. It was cancelled after its March 1, 1999 airing.  The show was named for stand-up comedian John DiResta; this was his first television venture.

The series was described by Entertainment Weekly as "A transit cop, his funny job, and his funny family." On the week of November 2–8, 1998, it was the lowest rated non-Pax TV show aired.

Cast
 John Diresta as Off. John Diresta
 Leila Kenzle as Kate Diresta
 Joe Guzaldo as Sgt. Kazmerek
 Sandra Purpuro as Off. Liz Labella
 David Batiste as Cal
 Erik Palladino as Tully
 Karle Warren as Anna Diresta
 Ruairi Kenna and Sean Kenna as Dakota Diresta
 Robert Costanzo as Vic Diresta

Episodes

References

External links

DiResta at the UPNcyclopedia

UPN original programming
1998 American television series debuts
1999 American television series endings
Television series by CBS Studios
Television shows set in New York (state)
1990s American sitcoms